Zachary Bethell (died 1635) was an English courtier, an usher, and administrator in the wardrobes of Anne of Denmark and Henrietta Maria.

He was a grandson of Richard Bethell, a mayor of Winchester. Zachary Bethell was a gentleman usher daily waiter usher and a gentlemen of the robes in the royal wardrobe. He bought his place from a Mr Izard. Bethell kept an account book (which is not known to survive). In 1640 Katherine Lisle sought an old debt to her grandfather, Edward Barnes, a silkman who had supplied Anne of Denmark. William Juxon observed that a part of the sum claimed was recorded as paid in Mr Bethell's book of "Queen Anne's Robes".

Bethell was involved in preparations for masques and entertainments, particularly at Greenwich Palace, and at Somerset House, where he prepared a space for Anne of Denmark to practice her dance for the The Masque of Beauty. He became Keeper of Somerset House, which he called "Denmark House" in his will. After the death of Anne of Denmark, he walked in her funeral procession with the usher John Tunstall. Inventories note some items of her clothing and linen in his keeping. By 1637 he was replaced as surveyor of the robes of Henrietta Maria by Mr White.

Bethell had a house close to St Giles in the Fields and was a neighbour of the queen's silkwoman Dorothy Speckard.

He died in 1635 and was survived by his wife Susan, and his son William Bethell who he disowned as a spendthrift with a bequest of 20 shillings.

References

Household of Anne of Denmark
People from Winchester
1635 deaths